Lycée Français André Malraux de Murcie or Lycée Français de Murcia is a French international school in Molina de Segura, Murcia Province, Spain.

It is about 21 minutes from Murcia, 30 minutes from Cieza, 37 minutes from Orihuela, and under an hour from Cartagena and Lorca.

It opened in 1987, and it has 650 students as of 2016. The school serves levels maternelle (preschool) through lycée (senior high school/sixth form college).

See also
 Liceo Español Luis Buñuel, a Spanish international school near Paris, France

Notes

External links
 Lycée Français André Malraux de Murcie 
 Lycée Français André Malraux de Murcie 

Murcia
Buildings and structures in the Region of Murcia
Education in the Region of Murcia
French international schools in Spain
Educational institutions established in 1987
1987 establishments in Spain